Monsignor Patrick Joseph Hartigan (13 October 1878 – 27 December 1952) was an Australian Roman Catholic priest, educator, author and poet, writing under the name John O'Brien.

Biography

Born at Yass, New South Wales Patrick Joseph Hartigan studied at St Patrick's Seminary, Manly and St Patrick's College, Goulburn   

His poetry was very popular in Australia and was well received in Ireland and the United States.

Hartigan died in Lewisham, an inner suburb of Sydney in 1952.

Works

Hartigan wrote under the pseudonym "John O'Brien." His verse celebrated the lives and mores of the outback pastoral folk he ministered to as a peripatetic curate in the southern New South Wales and Riverina towns of Thurgoona, Berrigan and Narrandera, in the first two decades of the 20th century.

The refrain We'll all be rooned from his poem Said Hanrahan has entered colloquial Australian English as a jocular response to any prediction of dire consequences arising, particularly, from events outside the interlocutor's control.

He also wrote a number of articles on early Irish priests in Australia, later collected in The Men of '38 and Other Pioneer Priests.

Legacy

His most popular book of poetry was filmed in 1925 as Around the Boree Log.

A John O'Brien Festival is held annually in Narrandera.

References

External links
 The Life and Poetry of John O'Brien  - brief biography, timeline and 25 poems
Brief biography and selection of Hartigan's bush poetry
John O'Brien's Poetry - brief biography and three poems
Narrandera's John O'Brien Festival
ADB article
 

1878 births
1952 deaths
Australian poets
20th-century Australian Roman Catholic priests
Catholic poets
People from New South Wales
People from the Riverina
Irish-Australian culture